Étang de Lacanau is a lake in Lacanau, Gironde, France. Its surface area is 19.85 km²

Lacanau
Landforms of Gironde